Josh Swade is an American documentary filmmaker and author, working primarily in the sports and music genres. His feature films include Ricky Powell: The Individualist, about street photographer Ricky Powell, which premiered on Showtime in 2021; One & Done, about basketball player Ben Simmons, which premiered on Showtime in 2016; and the 2012 ESPN 30 for 30 documentary There's No Place Like Home. He has directed and produced several ESPN 30 for 30 Shorts, and several short films on popular musicians, including The Black Keys, Rick Rubin, Sheryl Crow, Major Lazer, and Gary Clark Jr. He also wrote the book The Holy Grail of Hoops: One Fan's Quest to Buy the Original Rules of Basketball.

Early life and education
Swade was born in Kansas City, Missouri. He attended the University of Kansas, before transferring to City University of New York.

Career

Music
Following his graduation, Swade worked in A&R at Maverick Records, before co-founding the record labels Young American Recordings in 2005 and +1 Records in 2008. In 2014, +1 Records became a division of Lyor Cohen's 300 Entertainment. In 2018, +1 Records partnered with Empire Distribution.

Filmmaking
In November 2010, Swade read a New York Times story that James Naismith's original rules of basketball would be auctioned off on December 10, 2010. The ensuing 2012 ESPN 30 for 30 documentary There's No Place Like Home follows Swade, a lifelong Kansas Jayhawks fan, on his attempt to win the auction so that the rules could be housed at the University of Kansas in Lawrence, Kansas, where Naismith coached and taught for the majority of his career. University of Kansas alumnus David Booth and his wife paid $4,338,500 for the rules of basketball, setting a record for the highest sales price for sports memorabilia, according to Sotheby's, which conducted the auction. There's No Place Like Home premiered on ESPN on October 16, 2012. In 2013, Swade’s book The Holy Grail of Hoops: One Fan's Quest to Buy the Original Rules of Basketball was published, with an afterword by University of Kansas basketball head coach Bill Self. It was based on the events in There's No Place Like Home.

In 2014, Swade began work on #BringBackSungWoo, a 30 for 30 Shorts documentary which follows Sung Woo Lee, a South Korean longtime fan of the Kansas City Royals. The 22-minute film premiered on ESPN and Grantland on October 7, 2015.

In May 2015, Swade helped launch Rolling Stone Films, where he directed and produced films on musicians including Rick Rubin, The Black Keys, Sheryl Crow, Ringo Starr and Willie Nelson. His short film on Rubin, Rick Was Here, was the first Rolling Stone Films production, and was nominated for a 2014 National Magazine Award for Best Video.

In 2015, production began on One & Done, a feature documentary for Showtime. The film chronicles the life of Australian-born basketball player Ben Simmons, following him beginning in his senior year of high school at Montverde Academy, focusing on his lone year at Louisiana State University, and culminating in his selection as the top pick in the 2016 NBA draft. The film premiered on Showtime in November 2016. The film was noted for the way in which it exposed the inner workings of the amateur basketball system in the United States. New York Times writer Joe Nocera wrote, "'One & Done' will undoubtedly stir outrage among traditional college sports reformers... as well it should."

Swade's film Ricky Powell: The Individualist, about the life and career of New York City street photographer Ricky Powell, premiered at We Are One: A Global Film Festival on May 30, 2020, and on Showtime on December 10, 2021. It features interviews with Powell, Natasha Lyonne, LL Cool J, Chuck D, Laurence Fishburne, and Mike D, and was executive produced by Ahmir "Questlove" Thompson. Powell is renowned for his candid photos of artists including Jean-Michel Basquiat, Andy Warhol, Madonna, Eric B. & Rakim, Run-DMC and the Beastie Boys. Vogue magazine called the documentary "electrifying," writing that it "delivers a heady dose of nostalgia."

Swade directed and produced the 2021 five-part documentary short series Storied, covering the 2021-22 Syracuse Orange men's basketball season. Featuring behind-the-scenes footage and interviews with head coach Jim Boeheim and members of the coaching staff and team, it was released on October 12, 2021.

Filmography

Bibliography

Books
 The Holy Grail of Hoops: One Fan’s Quest to Buy the Original Rules of Basketball (Sports Publishing, New York, NY, 2013), afterword by Bill Self

Articles
 "A Love Letter To The Nike Air Max 1…" Nice Kicks, March 26, 2017

References

External links
 

Living people
American documentary filmmakers
Rolling Stone people
Writers from Kansas City, Missouri
University of Kansas alumni
City University of New York alumni
Artists from New York City
Year of birth missing (living people)